Lubov Raifovna Bakirova (born 11 January 1993) is a Russian former competitive pair skater. In 2009, she teamed up with Mikalai Kamianchuk to represent Belarus. Appearing at six ISU Championships, they achieved their best result, 10th, at the 2011 Europeans in Bern and the 2012 Europeans in Sheffield. They competed together until the end of the 2011−12 season.

Programs 
(with Kamianchuk)

Competitive highlights 
JGP: Junior Grand Prix

With Kamianchuk for Belarus

With Patlasov for Russia

References

External links 

 

Russian female pair skaters
Belarusian female pair skaters
1993 births
Living people
Sportspeople from Perm, Russia